Alexandre Moors (born 1972) is a French director, writer and editor.

Early life
Alexandre Moors is a French filmmaker born in Suresnes in 1972. As a teenager, he was an active member of the Parisian "graffiti" scene before attending Penninghen School and then the Arts Decos’ (ENSAD). He left Paris for New York City in 1998 where he has since worked as graphic designer, director and artistic director.

Career
He has directed several music video for singers like Miley Cyrus, Christina Aguilera, Chris Brown, Tyga, Big Sean, Kendrick Lamar, and Jennifer Lopez.

Filmography

References

External links

1972 births
Living people
French film directors
French film editors
French music video directors
French screenwriters
French graphic designers
People from Suresnes